Beinn a' Chreachain (lit. "Mountain of Scallops") is a Scottish mountain, with a conical top, to the north-west of Loch Lyon.

References

 The Munros, Scottish Mountaineering Trust, 1986, Donald Bennett (Editor) 

Munros
Marilyns of Scotland
Mountains and hills of the Southern Highlands
Mountains and hills of Perth and Kinross
One-thousanders of Scotland